Shadows on the Ground is the sixth solo studio album by Kieran Kane. The album was Kane's fourth solo album for Dead Reckoning Records, the label which he founded in 1994 along with fellow musicians Kevin Welch, Mike Henderson, Tammy Rogers, and Harry Stinson. This album was recorded live at Moraine Studio in Nashville, TN on July 5 & 6, 2002 (except for track 11 - recorded on 2-7-2001). Charlene Blevins of Paste magazine writes, "With Shadows on the Ground, Kane doesn’t exactly come full circle so much as he colors in the sphere of his career with a harmonious rainbow."

Track listing

Musicians
Kieran Kane: Guitar, Mandolin, Vocals
Mike Henderson: Harmonica, Mandolin, National Steel Guitar)
Sean Locke: Guitar, Vocals
Tammy Rogers: Fiddle, Mandolin, Vocals
Harry Stinson: Autoharp, Drums, Vocals, Pans, Pots
Glenn Worf: Bass
Fats Kaplin: Fiddle, Bajo Sexto, Button Accordion
Kevin Welch: Guitar
Claudia Scott: Vocals

Production
Kieran Kane: Producer, Cover Painting
Philip Scoggins: Assistant Engineer
Tracy Wallner: Art Direction
John Hadley: Photography
Kevin Rafferty: Photography
Mils Logan: Recorder, Engineer

All track information and credits were taken from the CD liner notes.

References

External links
Dead Reckoning Records Official Site

2002 albums
Kieran Kane albums
Dead Reckoning Records albums